Robertsfors IK is a Swedish football club located in Robertsfors. The club, formed 1907, is currently playing in the fourth highest Swedish league, Division 2.

Background
Robertsfors IK was formed in 1907 and bore the name Robertsfors Gymnastik och Idrottsförening for a short time.  In its early history the club specialised in gymnastics, athletics and football in the summer and skiing and ski jumping in the winter. In 1925 the club obtained the lease for Stantorsvallen where they still play.

The club currently plays in Division 3 Mellersta Norrland, the fifth tier of Swedish football.  In 2005 they gained promotion to Division 1 Norra but their stay at the higher level was short-lived and they were relegated back to Division 2 Norrland at the end of the 2006 season. A match many will remember from that season was when they won 7–2 against Enköpings SK FK, the league leaders. Robertsfors IK were very unfortunate to be relegated from Division 1 Norra because of inferior goal difference.

The club is affiliated to the Västerbottens Fotbollförbund.

Season to season

Attendances

In recent seasons Robertsfors IK have had the following average attendances:

Staff and board members

  Hans Erik Andersson – Secretary
  Per-Erik Berglund – Treasurer

Footnotes

External links

Robertsfors IK – official site

Football clubs in Västerbotten County
Association football clubs established in 1907
1907 establishments in Sweden